Bob and Mike Bryan were the defending champions, but Bob Bryan could not participate due to injury. Mike Bryan played alongside Frances Tiafoe, but lost in the quarterfinals to Ryan Harrison and Rajeev Ram.

Nicholas Monroe and John-Patrick Smith won the title, defeating Harrison and Ram in the final, 3–6, 7–6(7–5), [10–8].

Seeds

Draw

Draw

References
 Main Draw

BB&T Atlanta Open - Doubles
BB&T Atlanta Open - Doubles
2018 Doubles